The Craiova Group (Quadrilateral), Craiova Four, or C4 is a cooperation project of four European statesRomania, Bulgaria, Greece and Serbiafor the purposes of furthering their European integration as well as economic, transport and energy cooperation with one another. The Group originated in a summit meeting of the heads of governments of Bulgaria, Romania and Serbia, held on 24 April 2015 in the Romanian city of Craiova. At the group's inaugural meeting, Romania's then-Prime Minister Victor Ponta indicated that he was inspired by the Visegrád Group. Romania and Bulgaria both joined the European Union on 1 January 2007, while Serbia has been in accession negotiations since January 2014. Since October 2017 at the meeting in Varna, Bulgaria, with the inclusion of Greece, meetings have been quadrilateral.
 
One of the first initiatives, after a meeting in Vidin, Bulgaria, was to strengthen the telecommunication networks in the border areas of the countries. Other goals include helping Serbia join the European Union and the construction of a motorway linking Bucharest, Sofia and Belgrade.

On 2 November 2018, Prime Minister of Bulgaria Boyko Borisov stated that Prime Minister of Greece Alexis Tsipras proposed joint bid for the 2030 FIFA World Cup by Bulgaria, Romania, Serbia and Greece during the meeting in Thessaloniki.

Country comparison

See also 
 Central European Defence Cooperation
 Central European Initiative
 Frugal Four
 Inner Six
 New Hanseatic League
 Nordic Defence Cooperation
 Three Seas Initiative
 Visegrád Group
 Open Balkan
 Group of Nine

References 

Intergovernmental organizations
Bulgaria–Serbia relations
Bulgaria–Romania relations
Romania–Serbia relations
Eastern Europe
2015 in Romania
Group